Alan Carroll (10 December 1932 – 30 September 2017) was an engineer and Royal Air Force pilot who became the youngest leader of a British Antarctic base. He was awarded the Polar Medal by Queen Elizabeth in 2008.

References 

Royal Air Force officers
1932 births
2017 deaths